The 2021 Pacific Four Series was the first edition of the Pacific Four Series. The soft launch of the competition involved only Canada and the United States contesting two matches in Glendale, Colorado. The winner would be determined on aggregate score. Canada won the two matches on an aggregate of 22–41.

Australia and New Zealand were initially confirmed to join the competition, but because of the COVID-19 pandemic, World Rugby decided to go ahead with the soft launch with Australia and New Zealand joining in 2022.

Results

Day 1

Day 2

References 

International women's rugby union competitions hosted by the United States
2021 rugby union tournaments for national teams
2021 in women's rugby union
2021 in Canadian rugby union
2021 in American rugby union
2021 in Canadian women's sports
2021 in American women's sports
Pacific Four Series
Pacific Four Series